The Miass (Meyäs) is a river on the eastern side of the Ural Mountains in Bashkortostan, Chelyabinsk Oblast and Kurgan Oblast, Russia. It is a right tributary of the Iset, part of the Irtysh basin. The cities Chelyabinsk and Miass are located on the river.

References

External links
 Sunrise photo near Chelyabinsk- NASA

Rivers of Bashkortostan
Rivers of Chelyabinsk Oblast
Rivers of Kurgan Oblast
Ural Mountains